Riddlesworth is a civil parish in the English county of Norfolk.
For the purposes of local government, it falls within the district of Breckland.

St Peter's Church 
Situated just beyond Riddlesworth Hall and school, St Peter's has an early 14th century west tower and the plain octagonal font is 15th century.There is a fine monument to Sir Drue Drury (died 1617) of a kneeling knight with angels holding back curtains. The floor slabs at the end of the east end of the nave tell the sad tale of two ladies who were killed in their beds at the hall when a chimney stack fell on them in the 'furious hurricane' of 1703.

Riddlesworth Hall and School 
It is home to the Riddlesworth Hall School, a listed Grade II former country house, built in 1792 and subsequently reconverted into a private school, where Diana, Princess of Wales was a pupil. Set in large grounds, the school was acquired by the Confucius International Education Group in 2015 and caters for children from the age of 7.

Riddlesworth Polish camp and memorial 
During the Second World War, part of Riddlesworth Park was given over to a British Army camp for British troops. In 1946 this camp was redesignated as one of the nearly 150 Polish resettlement camps. These camps were set up under the 1947 Polish Resettlement Act to receive the nearly 250,000 Polish troops and displaced Poles stationed all over Europe at the end of the war. Riddlesworth Camp was one of five set up in Norfolk to receive 4,500 troops and housed the 3rd Heavy Machine Gun Battalion of the 3rd Carpathian Infantry Division. This unit had fought through Italy at all the major battles against German forces and had distinguished itself at the Battle of Monte Cassino in May 1944. The majority of the Polish troops from this camp decided to stay in England after 1948 and were gradually found jobs in the locality and made new lives for themselves never to return home to Poland.

In 2016, a permanent memorial to the Division was unveiled by the Polish Ambassador to the United Kingdom, Mr Witold Sobkow. The memorial was designed and built by local people with the support of the Parish Council. The project was led by Mr. Philip Bujak whose father, having served with the Division in Italy, came to Riddlesworth in 1946. Remains of the camp buildings can still be seen amongst the trees.

Gallery

References

External links 
 

Breckland District
Villages in Norfolk
Civil parishes in Norfolk